Fürstenberg was a county, and later a principality (Fürstentum), of the Holy Roman Empire in Swabia, which was located in present-day southern Baden-Württemberg, Germany. Its ruling family was the House of Fürstenberg.

History
The county emerged when Egino IV, Count of Urach by marriage, inherited large parts of the Duchy of Zähringen upon the death of Duke Berthold V in 1218, and it was originally called the county of Freiburg. Egino's grandson, Count Henry, started naming himself after his residence at Fürstenberg Castle around 1250.

The county was partitioned in 1284 between itself and the lower county of Dillingen, and then again in 1408 between Fürstenberg-Fürstenberg and Fürstenberg-Wolfach.

Over the centuries, the various rulers expanded their territories to include the Landgraviate of Baar, the Lordships of Gundelfingen, Hausen, Heiligenberg, Höwen, and Meßkirch, and the Landgraviate of Stühlingen in Germany, as well as domains around Křivoklát Castle, Bohemia, Tavíkovice (German: Taikowitz) in Moravia and Weitra in Austria.

In 1667, Fürstenberg-Heiligenberg was raised to a principality and received a vote at the Reichstag. In 1744, various Fürstenberg territories were reunified to the Principality of Fürstenberg-Fürstenberg, as all lines except one had become extinct.

The Rheinbundakte of 1806 dissolved the state of Fürstenberg. Most of its territory was given to Baden, and smaller parts were given to Württemberg, Hohenzollern-Sigmaringen, and Bavaria.

Geography
As of 1789, the territory consisted of five larger, isolated parts as well as several smaller exclaves. The five larger parts were:
 Around Donaueschingen, including the Landgraviate of Baar and the Lordship of Höwen as well as Fürstenberg Castle. Cities include Donaueschingen, Hüfingen, Engen, Neustadt. Bordered by Austria, Württemberg, the Abbacy of St. Blaise and others. Given to Baden.
 The Lordship of Hausen. Cities: Hausach, Wolfach, Haslach. Bordered by: Bishopric of Strasbourg, Württemberg, Austria, Hohengeroldseck, Imperial City of Zell, Imperial Valley of Harmersbach. Given to Baden.
 The Landgraviate of Stühlingen. Cities: Stühlingen. Bordered by: Abbacy of St. Blaise, Switzerland, Landgraviate of Klettgau. Given to Baden.
 Around Meßkirch. Cities: Meßkirch. Bordered by: Hohenzollern-Sigmaringen, Abbacy of Zwiefalten, Austria, Abbacy of Buchau, and others. Given to Baden and Hohenzollern-Sigmaringen.
 County of Heiligenberg. Bordered by: Königsegg, Abbacy of Weingarten, Austria, Lake Constance, Bishopric of Constance, Abbacy of Salmannsweiler, Imperial City of Überlingen, Imperial City of Pfullendorf, and others. Given to Baden.
The smaller exclaves included the cities of Trochtelfingen and Hayingen.

As of 1806, Fürstenberg had an area of 2,000 km2 and a population of 100,000. Its capital was Donaueschingen.

Counts of Fürstenberg (1250–1408)
Henry I, 1250–1284
Frederick I, 1284–1296
Henry II, 1296–1337
 Co-rulers:
Conrad III, 1337–1370
Henry IV, 1337–1366
John II, 1337–1365
Henry VI, 1365–1408

Partitions of Fürstenberg
County of Fürstenberg (1250–1408)
County of Dillingen (1284–1386)
County of Fürstenberg-Wolfach (1408–1490)
County of Fürstenberg-Fürstenberg (1408–1441, 1704–1716), then Principality of Fürstenberg-Fürstenberg (1716–1804)
County of Fürstenberg-Geisingen (1441–1483)
County of Fürstenberg-Baar (1441–1559)
County of Fürstenberg-Möhringen (1599–1641)
County of Fürstenberg-Blumberg (1559–1614)
County of Fürstenberg-Messkirch (1614–1716), then Principality of Fürstenberg-Messkirch (1716–1744)
County of Fürstenberg-Stühlingen (1614–1704)
County of Fürstenberg-Weitra (1705–1806)
County of Fürstenberg-Taikowitz (1759–1806)
County of Fürstenberg-Heiligenberg (1559–1664), then Principality of Fürstenberg-Heiligenberg (1664–1716)
County of Fürstenberg-Donaueschingen (1617–1698)
Principality of Fürstenberg-Pürglitz (1762–1806)

References

External links
 Where were the Fürstenberg territories? Map of the German Southwest in 1789
   Fürstenberg article.
 

 
Principalities of the Holy Roman Empire
Swabian Circle
States and territories established in 1218
Former states and territories of Baden-Württemberg